Operacja Himmler is a Polish historical film. It was released in 1979. It tells about the Gleiwitz incident.

Cast 
 Stanisław Frąckowiak – Alfred Naujocks
 Wirgiliusz Gryń – Sturmbannführer Hoffmann
 Eugeniusz Kujawski – Reinhard Heydrich
 Ryszard Pietruski – Adolf Hitler
 Janusz Sykutera – Heinrich Müller
 Tomasz Zaliwski – Wacław Stachiewicz
 Antoni Jurasz – Rolf
 Leszek Świgoń – teacher in SS school
 Jerzy Moes – Gestapo officer
 Paweł Unrug – officer of SS
 Andrzej Gazdeczka – Rudi
 Ryszard Kotys – prisoner
 Adam Baumann – uncredited
 Aleksander Mikołajczak – uncredited
 Olgierd Łukaszewicz – Schollenberg
 Czesław Stopka – uncredited

References

External links
 

1979 films
Polish historical films
1970s Polish-language films
Polish World War II films
Cultural depictions of Adolf Hitler
Films set in Poland
Films shot in Poland
1970s historical films